Voltigeur was the name ship of her class of destroyers built for the French Navy in the first decade of the 20th century.

Design and description
The Voltigeur class was based on the preceding , albeit with a different arrangement of propulsion machinery. Designed to displaced , the ships displaced  at deep load. Their crew numbered 76–77 men.

Voltigeur was powered by one triple-expansion steam engine and two Rateau direct-drive steam turbines. The steam engine drove the center propeller shaft while the turbines powered the two outer shafts, all using steam provided by four Normand boilers.

The primary armament of the Voltigeur-class ships consisted of six  Modèle 1902 guns in single mounts, one each fore and aft of the superstructure and the others were distributed amidships. They were also fitted with three  torpedo tubes. One of these was in a fixed mount in the bow and the other two were on single rotating mounts amidships.

Construction and career
Voltigeur was ordered from Ateliers et Chantiers de Bretagne and was launched from its Nantes shipyard on 23 March 1909. The ship was completed in April 1910.

References

Bibliography

 

Voltigeur-class destroyers
Ships built in France
1909 ships